Oakridge is a city in Lane County, Oregon, United States. The population was 3,205 as of the 2010 census. Surrounded by the Willamette National Forest and the Cascade Range, Oakridge is popular with outdoor enthusiasts for its hiking, mountain biking, wildflowers, fly fishing, birding, watersports, and the nearby Willamette Pass Resort.

The city was originally a community called "Hazeldell", and its post office was established on July 26, 1888. When a station on the Southern Pacific Railroad opened in May 1912, it was named "Oak Ridge" by a railroad executive for the surrounding topography, and on July 19 of that year the name was changed to be spelled as a single word.

The economy of Oakridge and nearby Westfir is centered on recreation. Since the lumber mills closed in the 1980s, the economy has been transitioning, with a new general store opening in 2010, a bakery in 2011, and a brewery and mercantile.

History

The area now known as Oakridge was first explored by Euro-Americans in 1852 as a possible route for pioneers coming from Central Oregon to the Willamette Valley. A post office was named "Hazeldell" in 1888, and the place's name later changed to "Big Prairie", and then "Oak Ridge". In 1912, a new community was formed and officially named Oakridge.  Since its beginnings as a mountain ranch, Oakridge has been a railroad boomtown, a loggers' haven, and an outdoor enthusiast's destination.

The early boom for Oakridge can be attributed to the Southern Pacific Railroad.  By 1910, work had already begun on Tunnel 22, a short route connecting Oakridge to the area now known as Westfir. Oakridge was a station on Southern Pacific's Cascade subdivision, a line that goes over Willamette Pass via the Natron Cutoff that was built in 1926, and the railroad played an integral part of the economy and lifestyle in Oakridge. The Union Pacific Railroad still operates the rails and trains are a common sight in Oakridge. Today, Amtrak's Coast Starlight passes through the town but does not stop.

On July 2, 1946, the Pope and Talbot Lumber Company purchased timberland near Oakridge.  By 1948, the company had built a large sawmill and had begun a massive timber logging operation.  While the railroad and Westfir's Hines sawmill began to slow down, the Pope and Talbot mill expanded and eventually employed more than 500 people.  The combined economic base of the railroad and sawmills accounted for the population growth of the 1960s and 1970s, when the community of Willamette City was consolidated into Oakridge. However, in 1978, the Hines mill in Westfir closed, and by 1985 the Pope and Talbot Mill had laid off all of its workers.  The City of Oakridge now owns the property that formerly housed the Pope and Talbot sawmill.

In February 2019, an Amtrak Coast Starlight train was stranded near Oakridge for over 36 hours, after a rare heavy snowstorm.

Geography

Oakridge lies in a small valley in the foothills of the Cascade Range and is completely surrounded by the Willamette National Forest. Five streams are located in and around Oakridge; they are Salmon Creek, Salt Creek, Hills Creek, and the Middle and North forks of the Willamette River, the latter of which has been designated Wild and Scenic. Diamond Peak, a shield volcano located in the nearby Diamond Peak Wilderness to the southeast, can be seen from various spots in and around Oakridge.

Climate
According to the Köppen Climate Classification system, Oakridge has a warm-summer Mediterranean climate, abbreviated "Csb" on climate maps. Oakridge is located below the snow line for the Cascades making it the last stop from Eugene on Highway 58 where chains are not necessary.

Demographics

As of the census of 2010, there were 3,205 people (up from 3,148 people at the 2000 census), 1,437 households, and 849 families residing in the city. The racial makeup of the city was about 91% White, 1% African American, 1.8% Native American, 0.6% Asian, 1.5% from other races, and 4.5% from two or more races. Hispanic or Latino of any race were 5.4% of the population.

There were 1,437 households, of which about 24% had children under the age of 18 living with them, about 42% were married couples living together, about 11% had a female householder with no husband present, about 6% had a male householder with no wife present, and about 41% were non-families. About 34% of all households were made up of individuals, and about 16% had someone living alone who was 65 years of age or older. The average household size was about 2.2 and the average family size was about 2.8.

The median age in the city was about 48 years. Twenty percent of residents were under the age of 18; about 7% were between the ages of 18 and 24; about 19% were from 25 to 44; 32% were from 45 to 64; and about 23% were 65 years of age or older. The gender makeup of the city was 50.2% male and 49.8% female.

Economy
The town's two largest employers are the Oakridge School District and the United States Forest Service.  However, in recent years there has been a cultural and economic revival centered on the outdoor recreational activities and local artists and craftspeople in the Oakridge area.  Many new small businesses have opened, including a bicycle shop/ski shop/mercantile, an outdoor guide service, a microbrewery, and a bakery.  The Uptown business district has formed the Uptown Business Revitalization Association (UBRA) and has worked to attract new businesses to the district.  In 2016, a craft distillery and tasting room opened.  While there is still a scarcity of local employment, Oakridge is creating new businesses and jobs 20 years after the closure of the lumber mill.

Transportation

Land 
State Highway 58, a designated freight route, serves as a major connection between Highway 97 and Interstate 5.  Running east-west, Highway 58 links the Willamette Valley with Central Oregon while crossing through the Willamette National Forest and Cascade Range.

Rail 
Union Pacific Railroad's main north–south line in the western two-thirds of the United States, with cargo shipping services, runs through Oakridge.  Amtrak shares the rail line and provides passenger train service to nationwide destinations from Eugene.

Bus 
Lane Transit District's Diamond Express runs three trips inbound and outbound on weekdays to the Eugene/Springfield area.

Air 

Oakridge State Airport is a public airport located one mile west of Oakridge.

Ports 

Education
The Oakridge School District consists of two schools and serves the children of Oakridge, Westfir, and outlying areas including High Prairie.    
 Oakridge Elementary School - Grades K–6
 Oakridge High School - 7–12
In 2008, Oakridge High School was recognized as one of the best high schools in America by U.S. News & World Report.

The Oakridge Public Library was built at 48318 E. First St., next to the city hall, in 2012. It was paid for with a federal grant of $800,000 and replaces a smaller library that was located in the city hall building.

Notable people
 Mason Williams, composer, "Classical Gas"
Maximo Yabes, Medal of Honor recipient
Laddie Gale, American basketball player

References

External links

 Entry for Oakridge in the Oregon Blue Book
 Oakridge featured on NPR's State of the Re:Union

Cities in Oregon
Cities in Lane County, Oregon
1888 establishments in Oregon
Populated places established in 1888
Populated places on the Willamette River